Paulino de la Fuente Gómez (born 27 June 1997), simply known as Paulino, is a Spanish professional footballer who plays as a winger for Liga MX club Pachuca.

Club career
Paulino was born in Santander, Cantabria, and began his career with AD Pandas at the age of six. In 2013, after representing Club Bansander (two stints) and Racing de Santander, he moved abroad and joined Inter Milan's youth setup.

On 1 February 2016, Paulino returned to Spain and agreed to a two-and-a-half-year contract with Atlético Madrid, being assigned to their Juvenil A squad. In July, he signed for Deportivo Alavés, being initially assigned to the reserves in Tercera División.

Paulino made his senior debut on 28 August 2016, playing the last 29 minutes in a 4–0 home routing of Santutxu FC. He scored his first goal on 8 December, netting the game's only in an away defeat of Pasaia KE.

A regular starter for the B's, Paulino renewed his contract until 2021 on 28 September 2018. He contributed with five goals in 24 appearances (play-offs included) during that season, as the club achieved promotion to Segunda División B.

Paulino made his first team – and La Liga – debut on 21 June 2020, coming on as a half-time substitute for Lucas Pérez in a 0–6 away loss against RC Celta de Vigo. On 23 September, he signed a one-year contract with Segunda División newcomers UD Logroñés.

Honours
Pachuca
Liga MX: Apertura 2022

References

External links

1997 births
Living people
Spanish footballers
Footballers from Santander, Spain
Association football wingers
La Liga players
Segunda División players
Segunda División B players
Tercera División players
Deportivo Alavés B players
Deportivo Alavés players
UD Logroñés players
Málaga CF players
Liga MX players
C.F. Pachuca players
Spanish expatriate footballers
Spanish expatriate sportspeople in Mexico
Expatriate footballers in Mexico